Mukesh Jadhav (born 1967) is an Indian film actor, director, and screenwriter.

Career

Mukesh  a theatre actor, writer, and director, began his career in the year 1989, when he was doing his masters in Chemistry at Mithibai College, Mumbai University.  He has received many awards for best actor and best director at a National level for his theatre productions. 

Post which he went on to act in serials such as Woh, Ssshhhh...Koi Hai, Karma (TV series), Aahat and Gudgudee. 

Mukesh  along with his acting career, joined director Kundan Shah as an associate director for films such as Kya Kehna, Dil Hai Tumhaara and Loveria. He has  worked with director Keval Singh on the Indo-Canadian production The City. He has writing credits on films such as Scotland Express , Dil Hai Tumhaara and many television drama serials. 

His directorial debut was with the Marathi feature film Kachru Mazha Bapa. He has written and directed several TV ad films, musical shows, corporate events, documentary and corporate films.

Mukesh has also professionally trained actors like - Preity Zinta, Vivek Oberoi, Shreyas Talpade and Vidyut Jamwal. 

In 2011 he received the Star Pravah Gurudakshina award, after being nominated by Shreyas Talpade.

Filmography
 Pratichhaya (director, expected 2019)
 Anaan (writer, 2017)
 Kachru Mazha Bapa (director, 2016)
 "Dil Hai Tumhara" (associate director, 2002) directed by Kundan Shah
 Loveria (associate director) directed by Kundan Shah
 Kya Kehna (associate director, 2000) directed by Kundan Shah
 The City (associate director) directed by Keval Singh 
 Hum To Mohabbat Karega (associate director, 2000) directed by Kundan Shah
 Scotland Express directed by Chinmay Purohit (writer)
 Yes Boss (film)  (assistant director, 1997) directed by Aziz Mirza

Television serials
 Naya Nukkad directed by Manjul Sinha, Aziz Mirza
 Filmi Chakkar directed by Ashok Pandit
 Aahat directed by B.P. Singh
 CID (Indian TV series) directed by B.P.Singh
 Dahashat directed by Santram Verma
 Woh directed by Glen, Ankush
 Kya Hadsa Kya haqiqat Balaji Telefilms
 Karma Balaji Telefilms
 Kasauti Zindagi Ki Balaji Telefilms
 X-zone
 Ssshhhh...Koi Hai
 Hello Inspector
 Lunatic directed by Sanjay Khanduri
 Gudgudee
 Hasaratein
 Raat hone ko hai
 Khauff
 Rooh
 Kahi Door Le Chalo
 Ruby Duby Hub Dub
 Koi Khiladi Koi Anadi

Plays
 Andha yug
 Chehare
 Kahan ho Phakir Chand
 Sugandhi
 Chal ud jaa re paanchi
 Mahaakaal
 Aswatthamaa
 Adipashya

Directed plays
 The Search
 Mahakaal
 Mrigtishna
 Mariamma
 Anteya
 Chal ud jaa re panchi
 Shunyatun Shunyat
 Teenagers Dream
 Khel
 Teen Ekke
 Jhootam A 1 Sundaram
 Cat Cat Category
 Aambaa
 Tim tim karte tare

Directed serials, short films and documentaries
 Phool Aur Patthar [serial]
 Anhonee [serial]
 Akaash Pankh [serial]
 Chotishi Baat [promotional Film]
 The Premonition [short film]
 Lapun Chapun [music video]
 Chill [video film]
 Bol ri Kathputli [short film]
 The City [film]
 Tuzha ni Maajha Ghar Shrimantaacha [ creative head]
 Bapacha Baap Jhaala [music video]
 Condemn it [social film]
 Kakphony [short film]
 Papa [telefilm]
 Hogi Salman ki Shaadi [music video]

References

External links
 Motion Media Arts (MMA)

1967 births
Living people
Film directors from Mumbai
Male actors from Mumbai
Mithibai College alumni
Screenwriters from Mumbai